Chang-Wha Chung (born November 1, 1928) is a South Korean film director, producer and screenwriter. Chung made his directorial debut with The Final Temptation (1953) and gained attention only when he released A Sunny Field in 1960. During the 1960s he started collaborating with the Hong Kong film industry. In 1968, he joined Shaw Brothers and directed martial arts classics such as King Boxer (1972) (the first Hong Kong movie to reach No. 1 on the U.S. box office in 1973). He moved to Golden Harvest in 1973, where he directed numerous productions until he returned to South Korea in 1977 to continue his career.

Filmography

Films 
This is a partial list of films.
The Final Temptation (1953)
A Street of Temptation (1954)
Second Start (1955)
Janghwa Hongryeon jeon (1956)
The Palace of Ambition (1957) 
A Sunny Field (1960)
A Bonanza (1961)
Jang Hee-bin (1961)
The Story of Jang-hwa and Hong-ryeon (1962)
Sunset on the River Sarbin (1965)
Dangerous Youth (1966) 
Six Assassins (1971)
King Boxer (aka Five Fingers of Death) (1972)
The Devil's Treasure  (1973)
The Association (1975)
The Double Crossers (1976) 
 1977 Broken Oath - Director.

Awards 
2011 31st Korean Association of Film Critics Awards: Award for Contribution to Cinema
2012 11th New York Asian Film Festival: Star Asia Lifetime Achievement Award
2015 52nd Grand Bell Awards: Lifetime Achievement Award

References

External links 
 http://www.changwha-chung.com/
  
 
 

1928 births
Living people
South Korean film directors
South Korean screenwriters
South Korean film producers